Zgórze may refer to the following places:
Zgórze, Gmina Dąbrowice in Łódź Voivodeship (central Poland)
Zgórze, Gmina Strzelce in Łódź Voivodeship (central Poland)
Zgórze, Masovian Voivodeship (east-central Poland)